The Equal Opportunity to Govern Amendment, also known as the Hatch Amendment, or even commonly referred to as the Arnold Amendment (referencing Arnold Schwarzenegger, who became the 38th Governor of California from 2003 to 2011), is a United States constitutional amendment proposed in July 2003 by Senator Orrin Hatch to repeal the natural born citizen clause prohibiting citizens who were naturalized from holding the office of President or Vice President of the United States. Hatch's amendment would allow anyone who has been a US citizen for twenty years to seek these offices. In the wake of the 2003 California gubernatorial recall election, this proposal was widely seen as an attempt to make California Governor Arnold Schwarzenegger (born in Austria and naturalized in 1983) eligible for the presidency and is sometimes nicknamed the "Arnold Amendment" or "Amend for Arnold". However, there are other politicians who were not born as American citizens and therefore would benefit from such an amendment. Notables include Secretary of Energy Jennifer Granholm (born in Canada, naturalized in 1981), former Florida Senator Mel Martinez (born in Cuba), former United States Secretary of State Madeleine Albright (born in Czechoslovakia), former Vermont governor Madeleine Kunin (born in Switzerland), congresswoman Ilhan Omar (born in Somalia), and former Secretary of Transportation Elaine Chao (born in Taiwan). The text of the amendment reads as follows:

The amendment was referred to the Committee on the Judiciary. Hearings were held on October 5, 2004, two months before the end of the second session of the 108th United States Congress, but no further action was taken.

A poll from 2003 and 2004 found that a majority of Americans were opposed to the amendment.

Entertainment connection

In the 1993 film  Demolition Man, Sandra Bullock's character, Lenina Huxley, mentions to Sylvester Stallone's character, 
John Spartan, about a "Schwarzenegger Library". After Spartan's surprised reaction, Huxley attempts to explain a "61st Amendment", at which time Spartan cuts her off, not wanting to hear the rest. It is implied that, in the timeline contained within the movie, at some point before 2032 in the United States, legislation similar to the "Equal Opportunity to Govern Amendment" was passed, repealing the "natural-born citizen" clause in Section 1 of Article Two of the United States Constitution, and allowing Hollywood actor Arnold Schwarzenegger to run for President of the United States, due to his referenced popularity.

As it turned out, a day short of a decade after the film's release, the 2003 California Governor's recall election was scheduled. The election started Schwarzenegger's career in politics when he won the election, becoming Governor of California after the state's then-Governor Gray Davis lost the recall election. It was shortly after Schwarzenegger's election as Governor of California that the "Arnold Amendment" was brought up for hearing.

References

External links

 Jerry Spangler: Hatch is pushing Arnold bill, Deseret Morning News October 7, 2004
 Statement of Senator Orrin G. Hatch before the United States Senate Committee on the Judiciary Hearing on “Maximizing Voter Choice: Opening the Presidency to Naturalized Americans”
 John Dean: The Pernicious "Natural Born" Clause of the Constitution: Why Immigrants Like Governors Schwarzenegger and Granholm Ought to be Able to Become Presidents, October 8, 2004

Arnold Schwarzenegger
Proposed amendments to the United States Constitution
United States proposed federal immigration and nationality legislation